The Vegas Knight Hawks are a professional indoor football team based in Henderson, Nevada, a suburb of Las Vegas. A member of the Indoor Football League (IFL), the Knight Hawks began play in 2022 at Dollar Loan Center. The Knight Hawks are owned by Bill Foley, owner of the National Hockey League's Vegas Golden Knights. 

The Knight Hawks are the fourth football team to play in the Las Vegas metropolitan area following the arrival of the National Football League's Las Vegas Raiders, the XFL Las Vegas Outlaws, and the Canadian Football League's Las  Vegas Posse, as well as being the fourth arena/indoor football team to play in Vegas following the defunct Las Vegas Sting, Las Vegas Gladiators, and Las Vegas Outlaws, all from the also defunct Arena Football League.

History
In May 2021, the Indoor Football League (IFL) announced that Bill Foley, owner of the National Hockey League's Vegas Golden Knights, and Chuck Brennan, the founder and CEO of the Dollar Loan Center, had purchased an IFL franchise to compete at the new Dollar Loan Center in Henderson, Nevada. The Dollar Loan Center was built to be the home of the Golden Knights' American Hockey League affiliate, the Henderson Silver Knights, with an expected completion in early 2022. On August 23, 2021, the team announced their name and logo, as well as introducing former Nebraska Danger head coach Mike Davis as the team's first head coach.

Head coaches
Note: Statistics are correct as of the 2022 Indoor Football League season.

Roster

References

External links
 
 Indoor Football League website

Indoor Football League teams
Sports teams in Las Vegas
American football teams established in 2021
2021 establishments in Nevada
Sports in Henderson, Nevada